Tripura Road Transport Corporation (TRTC), is the government agency overlooking public road transport in Tripura, India.

The transport department of Tripura, an undertaking (public) found it eligible for the provisions stated in 2005 Right to Information Act. It is the lonely government body, which controls each transport-related issue and controls many areas. The headquarter is situated in the western districts of Tripura which is the office of the joint transport commissioner, as well as different offices, are also situated in the north, south, and districts of Dhalai regions. The main branch office is located at Dharmanagar. The other unit is at Churaibari gate whose primary function is to inspect all the vehicles for the toll tax, which passes from that road.

Administration
TRTC is governed by the transport minister of Tripura. The departmental commissioner, respective secretary, and other officers of that particular section head the jurisdiction and operations fully. As the government, higher authorities control every function and they form the regulations. They have also formed different acts for the better running the transport system, which is as follows.
 State Transport and regional Authority of transport
 Motor vehicle (act)
 Transport Corporation (act)

Apart, from taking decisions regarding the movement of the vehicle, they also handle all the development issues such as the building of roads, installation of street lights, etc., and all management functions.

Hiring of buses
TRTC also hires buses and taxis at varying rates.

References

State agencies of Tripura
Roads in Tripura
Year of establishment missing